{{DISPLAYTITLE:Delta3 Tauri}}

Delta3 Tauri (δ3 Tauri) is a binary star system in the zodiac constellation of Taurus. Based upon an annual parallax shift of 21.96 mas as seen from Earth, it is located roughly 149 light years distant from the Sun. It is visible to the naked eye with a combined apparent visual magnitude of +4.32. δ3 Tauri is separated from δ1 Tauri by 0.72° on the sky. This star also has the traditional Latin name Cleeia, from the Greek Kleeia (transliteration of Κλεεια), who was one of the Hyades sisters. It is considered a member of the Hyades cluster.

The magnitude 4.35 primary, component A, appears to be an A-type subgiant star with a stellar classification of A2 IV. It is a candidate blue straggler and shows characteristics of an Am star. Abt (1985) gave it a classification of A2kA3hA5m, indicating that the spectrum displays the calcium K-line of an A2 star, the hydrogen lines of an A3 star and the metal lines of an A5 star. It is deficient in scandium but has enhanced iron peak and heavy elements. Although suspect of variability in the past, Delta3 Tauri A was subsequently determined to be photometrically constant.

The companion, component B, is a magnitude 8.37 star at an angular separation of 1.80 arc seconds along a position angle of 341°, as of 2010. At 77 arcseconds away (as of 2006) is a magnitude 11.12 visual companion, designated component C.

References

A-type subgiants
Am stars
Binary stars
Hyades (star cluster)
Tauri, Delta
Taurus (constellation)
Cleeia
Durchmusterung objects
Tauri, 068
027962
020648
1389